Micronemacheilus zispi is a species of stone loach. It is regarded by some authorities as being of doubtful validity and of being a synonym of Traccatichthys taeniatus, the genus Micronemacheilus is then used for placing Yunnanilus cruciatus in its own monotypic genus.

References

Nemacheilidae